The Zogu I Boulevard or Boulevard Zog I (formerly Stalin Boulevard) is a major boulevard in Tirana, Albania, named after Zog I of Albania, who ruled the country between 1925 and 1939. 

It runs in a northerly direction from the central Skanderbeg Square towards the recently completed New Boulevard of Tirana. South of the square the avenue becomes Dëshmorët e Kombit Boulevard, running south. During the communist period, the Boulevard was named 'Stalin Boulevard' and the name was changed after the restoration of democracy in Albania. 

In 2012, a statue of Zog I was placed in the boulevard in the event of the 100th Anniversary of the Independence of Albania.

See also
 Landmarks in Tirana
 Architecture of Albania

References

Streets in Tirana